Lizandro Enmanuel Claros Saravia (born 25 January 1998) is a Salvadoran professional footballer who plays as a defender for Primera División club FAS and the El Salvador national team.

Career

He was deported from the United States to El Salvador.

Claros started his career with Salvadoran side Independiente (El Salvador).

References

External links 

 
 

Salvadoran footballers
Living people
1998 births
Association football defenders
People from Usulután Department
C.D. Luis Ángel Firpo footballers
C.D. Águila footballers
El Salvador international footballers